Live in London is the first live DVD by American rock band The Gaslight Anthem which will be released on December 17, 2013 through Mercury Records. Most of the DVD's ten songs are from the band's 2012 album, Handwritten and were recorded during two shows at the Troxy in London on March 29 and 30, 2013. The cover forms a homage to the album art of The Clash's London Calling.

Track listing
"American Slang"
"The '59 Sound"
"Handwritten"
"45"
"Here Comes My Man"
"Too Much Blood"
"Great Expectations"
"Keepsake"
"She Loves You"
"Mulholland Drive"

Personnel
Band
 Brian Fallon – lead vocals, guitar
 Alex Rosamilia – guitar, backing vocals, 
 Alex Levine – bass guitar, backing vocals
 Benny Horowitz – drums
 Ian Perkins – guitar, backing vocals

References

The Gaslight Anthem albums
2013 albums
Live indie rock albums